Arkansas Highway 83 (AR 83, Ark. 83 and Hwy. 83) is the designation for a state highway in the U.S. state of Arkansas. The route is mainly located in Southeast Arkansas, and is split into two sections. The second section of the route begins at AR 54 north of Dumas and ends at AR 114 near Gould. AR 83 also has a spur route (designated as Highway 83S or AR 83S), which serves the University of Arkansas at Monticello's northern entrance, as well as Drew Memorial Hospital.

Route description

Monticello section 

The southern terminus for AR 83 is at the east entrance to the University of Arkansas at Monticello. The route travels east for about  before intersecting U.S. Route 425 (US 425) just south of Monticello, which shares a very short concurrency before heading north. The route heads through downtown, intersecting US 278 along the way. The route continues north before intersecting AR 54 at its northern terminus. The entire route is about ) long.

Dumas to Gould 

The southern terminus for AR 83 is at AR 54 just northwest of Dumas. From there, the route heads north for about  before reaching its northern terminus at AR 114 near Gould. The route does not intersect any other highways or towns.

Major intersections

Spur route

Highway 83S (AR 83S, Ark. 83S, Hwy. 83S) is a spur route that begins at the north entrance of the University of Arkansas at Monticello and ends at AR 83 in Monticello, just south of downtown. 

Major intersections

References

External links

083
Transportation in Drew County, Arkansas
Transportation in Lincoln County, Arkansas